Cunigunde of Hungary can refer to:
 Cunigunde of Luxembourg (975-1040), Empress of the Holy Roman Empire
 Kunigunda of Halych (1245–1285), Queen consort and Regent of Bohemia